This is a list of songs which reached number one on the Billboard Mainstream Top 40 (or Pop Songs) chart in 2017.

During 2017, a total of 18 singles hit number-one on the charts.

Chart history

See also
2017 in American music

References

External links
Current Billboard Pop Songs chart

Billboard charts
Mainstream Top 40 2017
United States Mainstream Top 40